Christian Valentin "Val" Brunn (born 20 July 1994), better known by his stage name Virtual Riot, is a German DJ and electronic music producer. He has released seventeen extended plays and two studio albums, most notably his 2016 extended play Chemistry, which peaked at 20 on Billboard's Dance/Electronic Albums charts and his 2018 extended play German Engineering, which peaked on the Dance/Electronic Digital Song Sales chart at the No. 11 position. He was signed to the independent music label Disciple Recordings in 2014. On 16 April 2019, he announced a publishing deal with Skrillex's OWSLA.

Career
Brunn has had numerous Beatport chart hits including "One For All, All For One" with Razihel and "Cali Born" with Helicopter Showdown. Other electronic music outlets, such as Your EDM, have called his music "non-traditional" and "edgy", comparing him to artists like Savant.

Prior to producing under the alias "Virtual Riot", Brunn produced ambient dubstep and future garage music under another alias, Your Personal Tranquilizer.

Brunn has released several EPs under British record label Disciple Records, including his charted EP, Chemistry. He produces in genres such as riddim, future bass, future garage, electro house, and both bass-heavy and melodic dubstep.

On August 9, 2021, Brunn announced his studio album titled Simulation, which was released on September 10.

Discography

Studio albums

Compilation

Extended plays

As featured artist

Singles

Mashups

VIP (Variation In Production) mixes

Original compilation features

Collaborations

Remixes

References

German record producers
German electronic musicians
1994 births
Living people
Owsla artists
Monstercat artists
German DJs
Electronic dance music DJs
Ableton Live users
Dubstep musicians